Davao Oriental, officially the Province of Davao Oriental, is a province in the Philippines located in the Davao Region in Mindanao. Its capital is city of Mati, and it borders the province of Davao de Oro to the west, and Agusan del Sur and Surigao del Sur to the north. The province is the traditional homeland of the Mandaya and Kalagan/Kaagan.

Davao Oriental is the easternmost province in the country with Pusan Point in the municipality of Caraga as the easternmost location. The Philippine Sea, part of the Pacific Ocean, faces Davao Oriental to the east. Part of the province lies on an unnamed peninsula that encloses Davao Gulf to the west.

The province is the top producer of coconut and copra in the country, earning the province the title Coconut Capital of the Philippines. It is also home to Mount Hamiguitan Wildlife Sanctuary, a UNESCO World Heritage Site.

Etymology
The name of the province was derived from the word, Dabaw, of which the center was west of the province.

History

Precolonial and Spanish periods

The present territory of Davao Oriental was covered by the historical region of Caraga, which was under the Sultanate of Maguindanao. The Spaniards established a permanent settlement in the region in 1591, and in 1844, the area was ceded by the Sultanate to Spain. An expedition was sent by the colonial government in Manila in 1847 to control the region, led by the Spaniard Jose Oyanguren, who settled in the town of Davao and organized the surrounding areas into the province of Nueva Guipozcoa in 1849. The province existed until 1858, when the politico-military commandancias of Davao and Bislig were created in its place. Bislig was incorporated into the District of Davao two years later.

American period

In 1903, the colonial American government created the Moro Province comprising several districts, one of which was Davao. The Moro province was converted in 1914 into the Department of Mindanao and Sulu, and its component districts were made into independent provinces.

World War II
In 1942, the territory of what is now Davao Oriental was occupied by the Japanese Imperial forces.

In 1945, beginning the Battle of Davao from the combined forces of the British, Australian, Dutch and the Filipino troops of the 6th, 101st, 102nd, 103rd, 104th, 106th, 107th and 110th Infantry Division of the Philippine Commonwealth Army and 10th Infantry Regiment of the Philippine Constabulary was supported by the recognized Davaoeño guerrilla fighter units by the attack to the Japanese Imperial forces during the liberation in Eastern Davao or Eastern Davao Campaign until the end of the Second World War.

Creation
On May 8, 1967, through Republic Act No. 4867, the province of Davao was divided into three independent provinces, one of which was Davao Oriental.

Geography

Davao Oriental covers a total area of  occupying the eastern tip of the Davao Region in Mindanao. The province is bordered by Davao de Oro to the west, Agusan del Sur and Surigao del Sur to the north, Davao Gulf to the southwest, and the Philippine Sea to the east and southeast.

The Eastern Pacific Cordillera mountain range encompasses the province. To the east of the range lie narrow strips of coastal areas, which feature several inlets and bays. The province encloses Davao Gulf to the southwest.

Climate
Davao Oriental has a pronounced rainy season and a short dry season, with maximum rainfall occurring from November to January especially at coastal areas.

Administrative divisions
Davao Oriental comprises 10 municipalities and 1 city, all organized into 2 legislative districts. There are 183 barangays in the province.

Demographics

The province is mostly inhabited by Cebuanos, who settled the province in the early 20th century from Visayas. Other ethnic groups include the Mandayas, Mansakas, Manobos and the Kalagan.

While the native languages spoken in the province are Kalagan, Mandaya and Davaoeño, Cebuano is the dominant first language. Chavacano is spoken by a minority, while Tagalog and English are widely used in business, education, and government.

Even some of the natives adhere to Christian faith (mostly Catholics), they are syncretic in some of their beliefs. Muslim Kagans traditionally inhabited the plains and coastal areas of the Municipalities of Banaybanay, Lupon, San Isidro, Governor Generoso, Mati and Tarragona.

Economy

Davao Oriental is the top coconut and copra (dried coconut meat) producer in the Philippines. It also is a major producer of abacá, and exports crude oil and copra pellets.

On March 20, 2018, Davao Oriental signed a memorandum of understanding (MOU) with Pionaire Finance Limited, a Hong Kong-based foreign firm for a $27-billion industrial park.

References

External links

 
 
 Davao Oriental wants Hamiguitan declared as world heritage site
 Philippine Standard Geographic Code
 News from Davao Oriental
 Davao Oriental Eco Industrial Park

 
Provinces of the Philippines
Provinces of the Davao Region
States and territories established in 1967
1967 establishments in the Philippines